JDS Mogami (DE-212) is the second ship of  of Japan Maritime Self-Defense Force (JMSDF).

Development and design 
This class was the first JMSDF surface combatant adopted shelter-deck design. Propulsion systems varied in each vessels because the JMSDF tried to find the best way in the propulsion systems of future destroyer escorts.

Main air-search radar was a OPS-2, Japanese variant of the American AN/SPS-12.

Construction and career
Mogami was laid down on 4 August 1960 at Mitsubishi Heavy Industries, Nagasaki and launched on 7 March 1961.

Modernization work was carried out from 15 October 1974 to 5 February 1975, and the Mk 108 anti-submarine rocket launcher and Mk.2 short torpedo launcher were removed, and the Type 71 Bofors rocket launcher and Type 68 triple short torpedo launcher It was equipped. 

On 1 July 1987, she was changed to a training ship, and the ship registration number was changed to TV-3505. Transferred to Training Squadron 1st Training Squadron and transferred to Kure. The remodeling work to the training ship was carried out from March 2 to June 11 of the same year, the long torpedo launcher and VDS were removed, and the trainee auditorium was newly established.

She was stricken on 25 March 1995.

References

1961 ships
Ships built by Mitsubishi Heavy Industries
Isuzu-class destroyer escorts